Andreas Forsström (born 24 January 1991) is a Swedish professional ice hockey player. He played with Modo Hockey in the Elitserien during the 2010–11 Elitserien season.

References

External links

1991 births
Modo Hockey players
Living people
Swedish ice hockey left wingers
People from Östersund
Sportspeople from Jämtland County